The Georgia–Florida League was a minor baseball league that existed from 1935 through 1958 (suspending operations during World War II) and in 1962–1963. It was one of many Class D circuits that played in the Southeastern United States during the postwar period—a group that included the Georgia State League, Georgia–Alabama League, Florida State League, and the Alabama State League.

The GFL's longest-serving clubs represented Moultrie, Thomasville and Albany, all in Georgia. While it managed to survive the downturn in minor league baseball attendance through 1958 and experienced only a handful of in-season franchise shifts (and no in-season team foldings), its member clubs frequently switched affiliations and identities.

In 1963, the minor leagues reorganized and the Georgia–Florida League was designated Class A. But there were only four teams in the '63 GFL, and its champion, the Thomasville Tigers, a Detroit affiliate, attracted only 7,234 fans over the entire course of a home schedule of over 60 games—an average of about 120 fans per game. Attendance woes such as that sealed the league's fate; it folded that autumn and has not since been revived.

Cities represented

Albany, GA: Albany Travelers 1935–1938; Albany Cardinals 1939–1942, 1946–1958
Americus, GA: Americus Cardinals 1935–1938; Americus Pioneers 1939–1942; Americus Phillies 1946–1950; Americus Rebels 1951; Americus-Cordele Orioles 1954
Brunswick, GA: Brunswick Pirates 1951–1956; Brunswick Phillies 1957–1958; Brunswick Cardinals 1962–1963
Cordele, GA: Cordele Reds 1936–1938; Cordele Bees 1939–1940; Cordele Reds 1941–1942; Cordele White Sox 1946; Cordele Indians 1947–1949; Cordele A's 1950–1953; Cordele Orioles 1955
Dothan, AL: Dothan Browns 1942
Dublin, GA: Dublin Orioles 1958; Dublin Braves 1962
Fitzgerald, GA: Fitzgerald Pioneers 1953; Fitzgerald Redlegs 1954; Fitzgerald A's 1956; Fitzgerald Orioles 1957
Moultrie, GA: Moultrie Steers 1935; Moultrie Packers 1936–1942, 1946–1947; Moultrie Athletics 1948–1949; Moultrie Cubs 1950; Moultrie To-Baks 1951; Moultrie Giants 1952; Moultrie Reds 1955–1956; Moultrie Phillies 1957; Moultrie Colt .22s 1962–1963

Panama City, FL: Panama City Pilots 1935
Tallahassee, FL: Tallahassee Capitols/Caps 1935–1942; Tallahassee Pirates 1946–1950 Tallahassee Capitols/Caps
Thomasville, GA: Thomasville Orioles 1935-1939; Thomasville Tourists 1940; Thomasville Lookouts 1941; Thomasville Tigers 1946–1950; Thomasville Tomcats 1952; Thomasville Dodgers 1953–1958; Thomasville Tigers 1962–1963
Tifton, GA: Tifton Blue Sox 1951–1953; Tifton Indians 1954; Tifton Blue Sox 1955; Tifton Phillies 1956 
Valdosta, GA: Valdosta Trojans 1939–1942; Valdosta Dodgers 1946–1952; Valdosta Browns 1953; Valdosta Tigers 1954–1958
Waycross, GA: Waycross Bears 1939–1942, 1946–1955; Waycross Braves 1956–1958, 1963

References
 Johnson, Lloyd, and Wolff, Miles, editors: The Encyclopedia of Minor League Baseball. Durham, North Carolina: Baseball America, 1997.

Defunct minor baseball leagues in the United States
Baseball leagues in Florida
Baseball leagues in Georgia (U.S. state)
Sports leagues established in 1935
Sports leagues disestablished in 1963
Baseball leagues in Alabama